Year 1234 (MCCXXXIV) was a common year starting on Sunday (link will display the full calendar) of the Julian calendar.

Events 
 By place 

 Europe 
 King Canute II (the Tall) dies after a 5-year reign. His rival, Eric XI (the Lisp and Lame), returns as ruler of Sweden (possibly after a civil war between the two of them). It is also possible that Canute dies of natural causes, and Eric peacefully then returns as king.
 King Andrew II of Hungary proclaims his son, Coloman of Galicia, as ruler (or ban) of Bosnia, who passes it on to Prijezda, a cousin of Matej Ninoslav, despite Matej being the legitimate ruler of Bosnia.
 Reconquista: King Sancho II of Portugal conquers the cities of Aljustrel and Mértola from the Moors.

 Mongol Empire 
 February 9 – Mongol–Jin War: The Mongol army led by Ögedei Khan captures the Jin capital at Caizhou, after a two-month siege (see Siege of Caizhou). Emperor Aizong of Jin abdicates the throne to Wanyan Chenglin, a descendant of the Jin imperial clan. After the Mongol and Song forces have breached the city walls, Aizong tries to escape, but commits suicide to avoid being captured. This marks the end of the Jin Dynasty (Great Jin).

 Africa 
 The Manden region rises against the Kaniaga Kingdom. This is the beginning of a process that will lead to the rise of the Mali Empire.

 By topic 

 Religion 
 November – Pope Gregory IX proclaims war on the city of Rome after a local revolt forces him into exile. He issues the papal bull Rachel suum videns, calling for a new crusade to the Holy Land.
 Lund Cathedral in Sweden is heavily damaged in a catastrophic fire. Large donations are made to the church, to rebuild the cathedral.

Births 
 Abaqa Khan, Mongol ruler of the Ilkhanate (d. 1282)
 Christina of Norway, Norwegian princess (d. 1262)
 Coloman Asen I, emperor (tsar) of Bulgaria (d. 1246)
 Conrad of Ascoli, Italian friar and missionary (d. 1289)
 Ippen (or Zuien), Japanese Buddhist monk (d. 1289)
 Manuel of Castile, Spanish prince (infante) (d. 1283)
 Margaret of Holland, Dutch noblewoman (d. 1276)
 Ou Shizi, Chinese Confucian scholar (d. 1324)

Deaths 
 January 7 – Robert of Auvergne, bishop of Clermont
 February 9 
 Aizong of Jin, Chinese emperor (b. 1198)
 Mo of Jin (or Hudun), Chinese emperor
 April 7 – Sancho VII (the Strong), king of Navarre
 April 16 – Richard Marshal, English nobleman (b. 1191)
 May 7 – Otto I, German nobleman and knight (b. 1180)
 June 18 – Chūkyō, emperor (tennō) of Japan (b. 1218)
 July 19 – Floris IV, Dutch nobleman and knight (b. 1210)
 July 29 – William Pinchon, French prelate and bishop
 August 7 – Hugh Foliot, bishop of Hereford (b. 1155)
 August 31 – Go-Horikawa, emperor of Japan (b. 1212)
 September 6 – Milo of Nanteuil, bishop of Beauvais
 September 26 – Eudes II of Ham, French nobleman
 Abu Muhammad Salih, Almohad Sufi leader (b. 1155)
 Alan fitz Roland (or Galloway), Scottish nobleman
 Baha ad-Din ibn Shaddad, Arab historian (b. 1145)
 Canute II (the Tall), king of Sweden (House of Folkung)
 Helen of Galloway, Scottish noblewoman and heiress
 Hugh de Neville, English Chief Forester and sheriff
 Ibn al-Farid, Arab poet, writer and philosopher (b. 1181)
 Minamoto no Ienaga, Japanese waka poet (b. 1170)
 Nasir ad-Din Mahmud (or Mahmud II), Zengid ruler
 Renard II (or Renaud), French nobleman and knight
 Rhys ap Rhys (the Younger), ruler of Deheubarth 
 Robert III (Gasteblé), French nobleman (b. 1185)
 Shihab al-Din 'Umar, Persian Sufi scholar (b. 1145)
 William of Andres, French abbot and historian
 Zhang Yuansu, Chinese physician and writer

References